SMS Dresden ("His Majesty's Ship Dresden") was a German light cruiser built for the Kaiserliche Marine (Imperial Navy). The lead ship of her class, she was laid down at the Blohm & Voss shipyard in Hamburg in 1906, launched in October 1907, and completed in November 1908. Her entrance into service was delayed by accidents during sea trials, including a collision with another vessel which necessitated major repairs. Like the preceding  cruisers upon which her design was based, Dresden was armed with ten  SK L/40 guns and two torpedo tubes.

Dresden spent much of her career overseas. After commissioning, she visited the United States in 1909 during the Hudson–Fulton Celebration, before returning to Germany to serve in the reconnaissance force of the High Seas Fleet for three years. In 1913, she was assigned to the Mediterranean Division. She was then sent to the Caribbean to protect German nationals during the Mexican Revolution. In mid-1914, she carried the former dictator Victoriano Huerta to Jamaica, where the British had granted him asylum. She was due to return to Germany in July 1914, but was prevented from doing so by the outbreak of World War I. At the onset of hostilities, Dresden operated as a commerce raider in South American waters in the Atlantic, then moved to the Pacific Ocean in September and joined Maximilian von Spee's East Asia Squadron.

Dresden saw action in the Battle of Coronel in November, where she engaged the British cruiser , and at the Battle of the Falkland Islands in December, where she was the only German warship to escape destruction. She eluded her British pursuers for several more months, until she put into Robinson Crusoe Island in March 1915. Her engines were worn out and she had almost no coal left for her boilers, so the ship's captain contacted the local Chilean authorities to have Dresden interned. She was trapped by British cruisers, including her old opponent Glasgow. The British violated Chilean neutrality and opened fire on the ship in the Battle of Más a Tierra. The Germans scuttled Dresden and the majority of the crew escaped to be interned in Chile for the duration of the war. The wreck remains in the harbor; several artifacts, including her bell and compass, have been returned to Germany.

Design

The primary alteration for the two Dresden-class cruisers, assigned to the 1906 fiscal year, consisted of an additional boiler for the propulsion system to increase engine power.

She had a crew of 18 officers and 343 enlisted men.

The engines were powered by twelve coal-fired water-tube boilers.

The ship was armed with a main battery of ten  SK L/40 guns in single mounts. Two were placed side by side forward on the forecastle, six were located amidships, three on either side, and two were placed side by side aft. They were supplied with 1,500 rounds of ammunition, for 150 shells per gun. The secondary battery comprised eight  SK L/55 guns, with 4,000 rounds of ammunition. She was also equipped with two  torpedo tubes with four torpedoes, mounted on the deck.

Service history

Dresden was ordered under the contract name Ersatz . She was laid down at the Blohm & Voss shipyard in Hamburg in 1906 and launched on 5 October 1907. The Oberbürgermeister of her namesake city, Otto Beutler, christened the ship. Fitting-out work then commenced, and Dresden was commissioned into the High Seas Fleet on 14 November 1908. Following her commissioning, Dresden began her sea trials. On 28 November she accidentally collided with and sank the Swedish galeas Cäcilie outside Kiel. She resumed sea trials in 1909, but a turbine accident necessitated further repairs, which lasted until September.

Although Dresden had not completed the required testing, her trials were declared over on 7 September, as she had been ordered to visit the United States. Dresden left Wilhelmshaven on 11 September and stopped in Newport, where she met the rest of the ships of the squadron. The ships arrived in New York on 24 September, remained there until 9 October, and arrived back in Germany on 22 October.

Dresden then joined the reconnaissance force for the High Seas Fleet; the following two years consisted of the peacetime routine of squadron exercises, training cruises, and annual fleet exercises. On 16 February 1910, she collided with the light cruiser . The collision caused significant damage to Dresden, though no one on either vessel was injured. She made it back to Kiel for repairs, which lasted eight days. Dresden visited Hamburg on 13–17 May that year. From 14 to 20 April 1912, she was temporarily transferred to the Training Squadron, along with the armored cruiser  and the light cruiser . For the year 1911–12, Dresden won the Kaiser's Schießpreis (Shooting Prize) for excellent gunnery amongst the light cruisers of the High Seas Fleet. From September 1912 through September 1913, she was commanded by Fregattenkapitän (Frigate Captain) Fritz Lüdecke, who would command the ship again during World War I.

On 6 April 1913, she and the cruiser  were sent from Kiel to the Adriatic Sea, where she joined the Mittelmeer-Division (Mediterranean Division), centered on the battlecruiser  and commanded by Konteradmiral (Rear Admiral) Konrad Trummler. The ships cruised the eastern Mediterranean for several months, and in late August, Dresden was ordered to return to Germany. After arriving in Kiel on 23 September, she was taken into the Kaiserliche Werft (Imperial Shipyard) for an overhaul that lasted until the end of December. She was scheduled to return to the Mediterranean Division, but the Admiralstab (Admiralty Staff) reassigned Dresden to the North American station to protect German interests in the Mexican Revolution. The cruiser Bremen, then in North American waters, was also due to return to Germany, but her intended replacement, had not yet entered service. On 27 December 1913, Dresden departed Germany and arrived off Vera Cruz on 21 January 1914, under the command of Fregattenkapitän Erich Köhler. The United States had already sent a squadron of warships to the city, as had several other countries.

The Admiralstab ordered Hertha, which had been on a training cruise for naval cadets, to join Dresden off Mexico. Bremen was also recalled to reinforce the German naval contingent; after arriving, she was tasked with transferring European nationals to German HAPAG liners. Dresden and the British cruiser  rescued 900 American citizens trapped in a hotel in Vera Cruz and transferred them to American warships. The German consul in Mexico City requested additional forces, and so Dresden provided a landing party of a maat (Junior Petty Officer) and ten sailors, armed with two MG 08 machine guns. On 15 April 1914, Dresden steamed to Tampico on Mexico's Gulf coast. That month, the German-flagged merchant ship  arrived in Mexico, carrying a load of small arms for the regime of Mexican dictator Victoriano Huerta. The United States had put an arms embargo into effect in an attempt to reduce the violence of the civil war. The US Navy intercepted Ypiranga on 21 April. Dresden arrived, confiscated the merchantman, and pressed her into naval service to transport German refugees out of Mexico. Despite the American embargo, the Germans delivered the weapons and ammunition to the Mexican government on 28 May.

On 20 July, after the Huerta regime was toppled, Dresden carried Huerta, his vice president, Aureliano Blanquet, and their families to Kingston, Jamaica, where Britain had granted them asylum. Upon arriving in Kingston on the 25th, Köhler learned of the rising political tensions in Europe during the July Crisis that followed the assassination of Archduke Franz Ferdinand. By this time, the ship was in need of a refit in Germany, and met with her replacement, Karlsruhe, in Port-au-Prince, Haiti, the following day. Lüdecke, who had arrived in command of Karlsruhe, traded places with Köhler aboard Dresden. The Admiralstab initially ordered Dresden to return to Germany for overhaul, but the heightened threat of war by the 31st led the staff to countermand the order, instead instructing Lüdecke to prepare to conduct Handelskrieg (trade war) in the Atlantic.

World War I

After receiving the order to remain in the Atlantic, Lüdecke turned his ship south while maintaining radio silence to prevent hostile warships from discovering his vessel. On the night of 4–5 August, he received a radio report informing him of Britain's declaration of war on Germany. He chose the South Atlantic as Dresdens operational area, and steamed to the Brazilian coast. Off the mouth of the Amazon River, he stopped a British merchant ship on 6 August. The ship, whose captain professed to know nothing of Britain's entry into the war, was permitted to proceed unmolested in accordance with the rules set forth in the Hague Convention of 1907. Dresden rendezvoused with the German collier , a converted HSDG vessel. After departing the atoll, en route to Trinidade, Dresden caught the British steamer ; Lüdecke took off the ship's crew and then sank the merchantman. Dresden captured the British collier  on 24 August and sank her after evacuating her crew. After arriving in Trinidade, she rendezvoused with the gunboat  and several steamers.

On 26 August, while steaming off the mouth of the Río de la Plata, she caught two more British steamers, but the poor condition of Dresdens engines curtailed further operations. On 5 September, Dresden put into Hoste Island for engine maintenance until the 16th. While the ship was there, the HAPAG steamer  arrived from Punta Arenas with news of the war, and the heavy merchant traffic off the western coast of South America. Lüdecke decided to steam there, and on 18 September Dresden passed the Strait of Magellan. While en route, Dresden encountered the French steamer ; Lüdecke refrained from attacking the transport ship, since she had fled into neutral waters. After steaming up the Chilean coast, she stopped in the Juan Fernández Islands, where she made radio contact with the light cruiser , which was operating on the Pacific coast of South America. Dresden saw no further success against British shipping, and on 12 October, she joined Vizeadmiral (Vice Admiral) Maximilian von Spee's East Asia Squadron, which had crossed the Pacific and was coaling at Easter Island. The following day, Lüdecke was promoted to Kapitän zur See (Captain at Sea).

They arrived at Más a Fuera island on 26 October. The flotilla arrived off Valparaiso on 30 October, and the following evening, Spee received intelligence that a British cruiser was at the Chilean port of Coronel. Spee decided his squadron should ambush the cruiser——when it was forced to leave port due to Chile's neutral status, which required belligerent warships to leave after twenty-four hours.

Battle of Coronel

At around 16:00, Leipzig spotted the smoke column from the leading British cruiser. By 16:25, the other two ships had been spotted. The German ships engaged their opposite numbers, with Dresden firing on Otranto. After Dresdens third salvo, Otranto turned away; the Germans claimed a hit that caused a fire, though Otranto reported taking no damage. Following Otrantos departure, Dresden shifted her fire to Glasgow, which was also targeted by Leipzig. The two German cruisers hit their British opponent five times.

At around 19:30, Spee ordered Dresden and Leipzig to launch a torpedo attack against the damaged British armored cruisers. Dresden increased speed to position herself off the British bows, and briefly spotted Glasgow as she was withdrawing, but the British cruiser disappeared in the haze and gathering darkness. Dresden then encountered Leipzig; both ships initially thought the other was hostile. Dresdens crew was loading a torpedo when the two ships confirmed each other's identity. By 22:00, Dresden and the other two light cruisers were deployed in a line that searched unsuccessfully for the British cruisers. Dresden had emerged from the battle completely unscathed.

On 3 November, Spee took Scharnhorst, Gneisenau, and Nürnberg back to Valparaiso for provisioning and to consult with the Admiralstab. Neutrality laws permitted only three belligerent warships in a port at a given time. Dresden and Leipzig remained with the squadron's colliers in Más a Fuera. Spee returned to Más a Fuera on 6 November, and detached Dresden and Leipzig for a visit to Valparaiso, where they also restocked their supplies. The two cruisers arrived on 12 November, left the following day, and met the rest of the squadron at sea on 18 November. Three days later, the squadron anchored in St. Quentin Bay in the Gulf of Penas, where they coaled. They left Britain on 11 November, and arrived in the Falkland Islands on 7 December.

On 26 November, the German East Asia Squadron left St. Quentin Bay, bound for the Atlantic. On 2 December, they caught the Canadian sailing ship Drummuir, which was carrying  of high-grade Cardiff coal. The following morning, the Germans anchored off Picton Island, where they unloaded the coal from Drummuir into their own auxiliaries. On the morning of 6 December, Spee held a council aboard Scharnhorst to discuss their next moves. With the support of the captains of Scharnhorst and Gneisenau, he successfully argued for an attack on the Falklands to destroy the British wireless station and coal stocks there. Lüdecke and the captains of Leipzig and Nürnberg all opposed the plan, and were in favor of bypassing the Falklands and proceeding to the La Plata area to continue to raid British shipping.

Battle of the Falkland Islands

On the afternoon of 6 December, the German ships departed Picton Island, bound for the Falklands. On 7 December, they rounded Tierra del Fuego and turned north into the Atlantic. They arrived off the Falklands at around 02:00; three hours later, Spee detached Gneisenau and Nürnberg to land a party ashore. By 08:30, the ships were approaching Port Stanley, when they noticed thick columns of smoke rising from the harbor. After closing to the harbor entrance, they quickly realized they were confronted by a much more powerful squadron, which was just getting up steam. Spee immediately broke off the operation and turned east to flee before the British ships could catch his squadron. By 10:45, Gneisenau and Nürnberg had rejoined the fleet, and the German auxiliaries were detached to seek shelter in the maze of islands off Cape Horn.

The British ships set off in pursuit, and by 12:50, Sturdee's two battlecruisers had overtaken the Germans. A minute later, he gave the order to open fire at the trailing German ship, Leipzig. Spee ordered the three small cruisers to try to escape to the south, while he turned back with Scharnhorst and Gneisenau in an attempt to hold off the British squadron. Sturdee had foreseen this possibility, and so had ordered his armored and light cruisers to pursue the German light cruisers. The battlecruisers quickly overwhelmed Spee's armored cruisers, and destroyed them with heavy loss of life. Dresden, with her turbine engines, was able to outpace her pursuers, and was the only German warship to escape destruction. Lüdecke decided to take his ship into the islands off South America to keep a steady supply of coal available.

On 9 December, she passed back around Cape Horn to return to the Pacific. That day, she anchored in Sholl Bay, with only  of coal remaining. Oberleutnant zur See (lieutenant at sea) Wilhelm Canaris convinced the Chilean naval representative for the region to permit Dresden to remain in the area for an extra twenty-four hours so enough coal could be taken aboard to reach Punta Arenas. She arrived there on 12 December, and received  of coal from a German steamer. The Admiralstab hoped Dresden would be able to break through to the Atlantic and return to Germany, but the poor condition of her engines precluded this. Lüdecke instead decided to attempt to cross the Pacific via Easter Island, the Solomon Islands, and the Dutch East Indies and raid commerce in the Indian Ocean. Dresden took on another  of coal on 19 January. On 14 February, Dresden left the islands off the South American coast for the South Pacific. On 27 February, the cruiser captured the British barque Conway Castle south of Más a Tierra. From December to February, the German liner  had supplied Dresden and had accompanied her northward to a final coaling at Juan Fernández Islands just before the cruiser was scuttled.

Both ships immediately raised steam, and Dresden escaped after a five-hour chase. The strenuous effort depleted her coal stocks and overtaxed her engines. Lüdecke decided his ship was no longer operational, and determined to have his ship interned to preserve it. The following morning, she put into Más a Fuera, dropping anchor in Cumberland Bay at 8:30. The following day, Lüdecke received by wireless the German Admiralty's permission to let Dresden be interned, and so Lüdecke informed the local Chilean official of his intention to do so.

Battle of Más a Tierra

On the morning of 14 March, Kent and Glasgow approached Cumberland Bay; their appearance was relayed back to Dresden by one of her pinnaces, which had been sent to patrol the entrance to the bay. Dresden was unable to maneuver, owing to her fuel shortage, and Lüdecke signaled that his ship was no longer a combatant. The British disregarded this message, as well as a Chilean vessel that approached them as they entered the bay. Glasgow opened fire, in violation of Chile's neutrality; Britain had already informed Chile that British warships would disregard international law if they located Dresden in Chilean territorial waters. Shortly thereafter, Kent joined in the bombardment as well. The German gunners fired off three shots in response, but the guns were quickly knocked out by British gunfire.

Lüdecke sent the signal "Am sending negotiator" to the British warships, and dispatched Canaris in a pinnace; Glasgow continued to bombard the defenseless cruiser. In another attempt to stop the attack, Lüdecke raised the white flag, which prompted Glasgow to cease fire. Canaris came aboard to speak with Captain John Luce; the former strongly protested the latter's violation of Chile's neutrality. Luce simply replied that he had his orders, and demanded an unconditional surrender. Canaris explained that Dresden had already been interned by Chile, and thereafter returned to his ship, which had in the meantime been prepared for scuttling.

At 10:45, the scuttling charge detonated in the bow and exploded the forward ammunition magazines. The bow was badly mangled; in about half an hour, the ship had taken on enough water to sink. As it struck the sea floor, the bow was torn from the rest of the ship, which rolled over to starboard. As the rest of the hull settled below the waves, a second scuttling charge exploded in the ship's engine rooms.

Aftermath

Most of the ship's crew managed to escape; only eight men were killed in the attack, with another twenty-nine wounded. The British auxiliary cruiser  took fifteen severely wounded men to Valparaiso; four of them died. The destruction of his ship had left Lüdecke in shock, and so Canaris took responsibility for the fate of the ship's crew. They remained on the island for five days until two Chilean warships brought a German passenger ship to take the men to Quiriquina Island, where they were interned for the duration of the war. Canaris escaped from the internment camp on 5 August 1915 and reached Germany exactly two months later. On 31 March 1917, a small group of men escaped on the Chilean barque Tinto; the voyage back to Germany lasted 120 days. The rest of the crew did not return to Germany until 1920.

In 2002, the first survey of the wreck was done by a team led by James P. Delgado for the Sea Hunters documentary produced by the National Underwater and Marine Agency. The team included the archaeologist Dr. Willi Kramer, the first German to visit the wreck since she sank 88 years before. Dresden lies on her starboard side pointed north, toward the beach. The wreck is heavily damaged; much of the upper works, including the bridge, the masts, the funnels, and many of the guns have been torn from the ship. The bow was cut off by the scuttling charges detonated by the ship's crew, and sits upright on the sea floor. The stern is also badly damaged, with the main deck blasted away and many shell holes in the ship's side. Some of the damage to the aft of the ship appears to have been done by an undocumented salvage operation before Delgado's survey. According to German records, Dresden was carrying gold coins from their colony at Tsingtau; Delgado speculated that this salvage work was an attempt to retrieve these.

In 1965, the ship's compass and several flags were recovered and returned to Germany, where they are held at the German Naval Academy Mürwik in Flensburg-Mürwik. In 2006, Chilean and German divers found and recovered Dresdens bell, which is now in Germany. C. S. Forester's 1929 novel Brown on Resolution, and two subsequent movies, were inspired by the Dresdens escape and subsequent destruction.

Notes

Footnotes

Citations

References

Further reading

 
 
 

1907 ships
1915 in Chile
Dresden-class cruisers
Scuttled vessels of Germany
Ships built in Hamburg
Shipwrecks in the Chilean Sea
World War I cruisers of Germany
World War I commerce raiders
World War I shipwrecks in the Pacific Ocean

es:SMS Dresden
fr:Classe Dresden